Tazehabad (also Romanized as Tāzehābād) is a village in Panj Hezareh Rural District, in the Central District of Behshahr County, Mazandaran Province, Iran. At the 2006 census, its population was 376, in 87 families.

References 

Populated places in Behshahr County